School for Spies is the second studio album by Kit Hain. The track titled "Fallen Angel" was covered by Roger Daltrey and released on his 1985 solo album Under a Raging Moon.

Track listings
All tracks written by Kit Hain
"Pulling Apart"
"School for Spies" (Kit Hain, Chris Bradford)
"Perfect Timing"
"I Need to Be with You"
"Bells of Old Paris" (Kit Hain, Chris Bradford)
"Fallen Angel"
"Cry Wolf"
"After the Darkness"
"Too Far Too Soon"
"Wild Ones Dance"

Personnel
 Kit Hain – lead vocals, keyboards 
 Chris Spedding – guitars 
 Anthony Jackson – bass guitar 
 Allan Schwartzberg – drums 
 Mike Thorne – keyboards
 Julian Marshall – harpsichord
 John Gatchell – trumpet
 Dave Tofani – saxophone
 Lou Toby – accordion
 Diana Halprin – violin
 Robert Medici – marimba

References

1983 albums
Albums produced by Mike Thorne
Mercury Records albums